This article displays the qualifying draw for women's singles at the 2002 Australian Open.

Seeds

Qualifiers

Lucky losers
  Pavlina Nola

Draw

First qualifier

Second qualifier

Third qualifier

Fourth qualifier

Fifth qualifier

Sixth qualifier

Seventh qualifier

Eighth qualifier

Ninth qualifier

Tenth qualifier

Eleventh qualifier

Twelfth qualifier

External links
 WTA Draws Archive
 2002 Australian Open – Women's draws and results at the International Tennis Federation

Women's Singles Qualifying
Australian Open (tennis) by year – Qualifying